Jairon Feliciano Damásio, known simply as Jairon, (born 21 April 1981) is a Brazilian ex professional football player.

Career
After playing many years in Brazil in some prominent clubs like Nacional (SP) or Guaraní, in 2005, Petkovic moved this player to Serbia and signed with the historic Serbian First League club Radnički Niš.Macedonian First League club FK Pobeda before moving, in 2007, to Greece to play in Agrotikos Asteras in Greek second level. After one season there, he has moved to Persebaya and play in the ISL club Persebaya Surabaya played in this club 11 Games scored 21 goals and made history in this club and bring Persebaya promoted to ISL. He also played with Persema Malang before moving to Perseman Manokwari in 2011, season 2012 jairon moving to Persibo Bojonegoro and there he was champion of the Indonesian Cup, after great season he moved to Saudi Arabian Al Nasr.

Honours
Pobeda Prilep
Macedonian First League: 2006-07

Persibo Bojonegoro
Indonesian Cup: 2012

References

External sources
 Official page
 Profile at Srbijafudbal

Living people
1981 births
Brazilian footballers
Brazilian expatriate footballers
Association football forwards
Democrata Futebol Clube players
Guarani FC players
FK Radnički Niš players
Serbian First League players
Expatriate footballers in Serbia and Montenegro
HŠK Posušje players
Expatriate footballers in Bosnia and Herzegovina
FK Pobeda players
Expatriate footballers in North Macedonia
Expatriate footballers in Greece
Persebaya Surabaya players
Persema Malang players
Brazilian expatriate sportspeople in North Macedonia